Nick Nairn (born 12 January 1959)  is a Scottish celebrity chef. He became the youngest Scottish chef to win a Michelin star in the early 1990s.

Early life 
Nairn was born in Stirling in January 1959 and grew up in the village of Port of Menteith in Stirlingshire. He attended McLaren High School in Callander before joining the merchant navy at the age of 17 in 1976. He studied at the Glasgow College of Nautical Studies and served in the Merchant Navy until 1983.
He now lives in Bridge of Allan.

Work 
Despite a lack of formal training, he opened his first restaurant, Braeval near Aberfoyle, in 1986. The restaurant won a Michelin star in 1991, making Nairn the youngest Scottish chef to win a star.

Nairn went on to open Nairns restaurant in Glasgow in 1998 and a cook school in 2000 at Lake of Menteith. In 2003, he sold his restaurant in Glasgow to concentrate on the cookery school, although he also undertakes a range of corporate work.  In 2012 he opened his second cook school, which is located in Aberdeen.

Nairn was a regular chef on BBC's popular Ready Steady Cook from 1995 and presented the Wild Harvest and Island Harvest television programmes in 1996 and 1997. He has written a number of books and columns for newspapers and magazines and has appeared on a range of television programmes, including a stint as the main presenter on the BBC Scotland programme Landward from 2007 to 2009. In 2008 he defeated Tom Lewis in the Scottish heat of the BBC television series Great British Menu. He went on to cook a main course of roe venison for Queen Elizabeth II and 250 guests at the Mansion House for her official 80th birthday celebration.

Nairn was awarded an honorary doctorate by the University of Stirling in 2007 for his contributions to Scottish cooking and healthy eating campaigns. He was awarded a second honorary doctorate from Abertay University in June 2016. 

In December 2017 Nairn was the victim of an assault in Aberdeen.

On 28 August 2021, a huge fire on a Saturday evening damaged his restaurant, Nick's, in Stirling. No casualties were reported.

References

External links
 Link to Nick Nairn's cookery school website
 Jisc listing of all of his publications
 Nick Nairn plans to open his 2nd cookery school in Inchmarlo, Aberdeenshire

1959 births
Living people
Scottish chefs
Scottish television chefs
Head chefs of Michelin starred restaurants